Sangan-e Sofla (also Romanized as Sangān-e Soflá; also known as Sangān-e Pā’īn and Sangān) is a village in Khandan Rural District, Tarom Sofla District, Qazvin County, Qazvin Province, Iran. At the 2006 census, its population was 114, in 40 families.

References 

Populated places in Qazvin County